Catherine Madeleine Hansson (born 26 March 1958, in Malmö) is a Swedish actress. She studied at Malmö Theatre Academy 1976–79.

Selected filmography
2013 - En pilgrims död (TV)
2006 - Underbara älskade
2002 - Bella – bland kryddor och kriminella (TV)
2002 - Skeppsholmen (TV series)
2002 - Den osynlige
2001 - Pusselbitar (TV)
2001 - Festival
1999 - Anna Holt (TV)
1997 - Aspiranterna (TV)
1996 - Kalle Blomkvist – Mästerdetektiven lever farligt
1994 - Tre Kronor (TV series)
1994 - Du bestämmer (TV)
1993 - Murder at the Savoy
1979 - Våning för 4 (TV)

References

External links

Swedish film actresses
Swedish television actresses
Living people
1958 births
People from Malmö